Azygophleps asylas is a moth in the family Cossidae. It is found from central to southern Africa, including Namibia and South Africa.

References

Moths described in 1779
Azygophleps
Moths of Africa
Insects of Namibia